Jigsaw is a personality-based online dating application. The face of the user in this application is hidden using a digital jigsaw puzzle and the face reveals piece by piece through profile interactions and message exchanges. The concept was granted a US patent in early 2021.

History 
In 2016, Alex Durrant and Max Adamski released a beta app called JigTalk, which covered and revealed entire user photos based on the word count of the messages sent. Later, JigTalk became the first British company to enter and graduate from NASDAQ’s Milestone Makers incubator in San Francisco. JigTalk officially launched the application in London in 2019. During the COVID-19 lockdown, the company rebranded to Jigsaw covering only the users’ faces and launched in the US in 2021. In February 2021, the application received seed funding of £2.7 million ($3.7 million) from The Relationship Corp., and other angel investors.

It has more than 150,000 registered users in the UK and US, as of November 2021. The company headquarters is in Manchester in the United Kingdom with 14 employees.

Overview 
The application is compatible with Android and iOS operating systems. 

The focus of Jigsaw Dating is on conversation rather than on photos. In this application, the users’ faces are covered with a digital jigsaw puzzle made up of 16 pieces. The pieces are removed gradually as the pair mutually exchange messages. The full face is revealed after a pre-set amount of in-app engagement.

References

External links 

Online dating services of the United Kingdom